Nic Rouse (born 10 February 1981 in Chatham, Kent, England) is a former rugby union player for London Irish in the RFU Premiership. He previously played for Sale Sharks in the Aviva Premiership. He plays as a lock. Rouse joined Sale Sharks in 2010 from Nottingham.  He had previously made over 120 appearances for Nottingham and enjoyed a short spell on loan to London Irish in 2008 when injuries to Nick Kennedy, James Hudson and Bob Casey meant the club had only 1 fit lock. 
Rouse was educated in Newbury and from the age of 5 played rugby at Newbury Rugby Club.  He joined the Bath Rugby Academy in 1999 and subsequently spent time with Caerphilly, Manchester and several seasons with Plymouth Albion before joining Nottingham in 2006 when he was awarded 'Player of the Year' in his first season.  He was named in the National One 'Dream Team' in Rugby Times twice and has represented England Students and England Counties. Rouse retired in April 2016 after ongoing injury problems.

References

External links
Guinness Premiership profile

1981 births
Living people
English rugby union players
London Irish players
Plymouth Albion R.F.C. players
Rugby union players from Kent
Rugby union locks
Sale Sharks players